Transdev Sydney Ferries, formerly Harbour City Ferries, is a subsidiary of Transdev Australasia, and is the operator of ferry services in the Sydney Ferries network since July 2012. It currently operates the ferry network under a contract until June 2028. As part of the operation contract, Transdev Sydney Ferries leases both the Balmain Maintenance Facility and the fleet from the government agency Sydney Ferries.

History
In 2011, the NSW government decided to contract out ferry services to the private sector. Harbour City Ferries was formed as a 50/50 joint venture between Transfield Services (later Broadspectrum) and Veolia Transdev (later Transdev). In May 2012, Harbour City Ferries was announced as the successful tenderer to operate the services on a seven-year contract starting 28 July 2012.

In December 2016, Harbour City Ferries became fully owned by Transdev Australasia after Transdev bought out Broadspectrum's 50% shareholding. , Harbour City Ferries employs more than 650 people and its fleet consisted of 32 vessels. The government acquired six more ferries in 2017 that were added to the Harbour City Ferries fleet.

In July 2019, Harbour City Ferries commenced a new contract to operate the ferries until June 2028. To coincide with the contract, Harbour City Ferries was rebranded Transdev Sydney Ferries. Its website was updated prematurely in June 2019 to reflect the name change. Ten new River-class ferries were commissioned in 2021. 3 Emerald Class Ferries entered service in 2021 however were withdrawn in 2022 due to multiple steering failures.

Ferry classes

Fleet

References

Ferry companies of New South Wales
Ferry transport in Sydney
Transdev
Transport companies established in 2012
Australian companies established in 2012
Companies based in Sydney